The 1985 KFK competitions in Ukraine were part of the 1985 Soviet KFK competitions that were conducted in the Soviet Union. It was 21st season of the KFK in Ukraine since its introduction in 1964. The winner eventually qualified to the 1986 Soviet Second League.

First stage

Group 1

Group 2

Group 3

Group 4

Group 5

Group 6

Final
The finals took place in Krasnoperekopsk and Armyansk, both in Crimean Oblast.

Ukrainian Football Amateur League seasons
Amateur